The 2017 National Hurling League was the 86th season of the National Hurling League for county teams.

Clare were the defending champions, winning the title for the first time since 1977–78 after a 1–23 to 2–19 win against Waterford in a replay on 8 May 2016.

Eir Sport (formerly Setanta) and TG4 provide live coverage of the league on Saturday nights and Sunday afternoons respectively, with highlights shown on GAA 2017 during the week. RTÉ2 broadcasts highlights programme Allianz League Sunday on Sunday evenings.

In the Division 1 final on 23 April, Galway won the title after a 3–21 to 0–14 win against Tipperary at the Gaelic Grounds.

Format

League structure

Thirty three teams compete in the 2017 NHL – six teams in the top four divisions (Divisions 1A, 1B, 2A, 2B), four teams in Division 3A and five teams in Division 3B. Thirty-one county teams from Ireland take part (Cavan do not). London and Warwickshire complete the lineup. Fingal were scheduled to compete in Division 3A but have withdrawn for 2017.

Each team plays all the other teams in their division once, either home or away in all divisions except Division 3A where a double round of fixtures are played. Two points are awarded for a win, and one for a draw.

On a pilot basis in 2017, the hurling quarter-finals and semi-finals will finish on the day the games are played avoiding the need for replays. If a quarter-final or semi-final is level after the initial seventy minutes, still level after two ten minute periods of extra time played each way, and still level after two further five minute periods of extra time, the outcome will be decided by a free-taking competition. This will prevent games from going to a replay and allow the league finals to be held on the scheduled date.

Tie-breaker
 If only two teams are level on league points, the team that won the head-to-head match is ranked ahead. If this game was a draw, score difference (total scored minus total conceded in all games) is used to rank the teams.
 If  three or more teams are level on league points, score difference is used to rank them.

Finals, promotions and relegations

Division 1A
 The top four teams qualify for the Division 1 quarter-finals
 The bottom two teams meet in a relegation play-off, with the losing team relegated to Division 1B
Division 1B
 The top team is promoted to Division 1A
 The top four teams qualify for the Division 1 quarter-finals
 The bottom two teams meet in a play-off, with the losing team relegated to Division 2A
Division 2A
 The top two teams meet in Division 2A final, with the winning team promoted to Division 1B
 The bottom team is relegated to Division 2B
Division 2B
 The top two teams meet in Division 2B final, with the winning team being promoted to Division 2A
 The bottom two teams meet in a play-off, with the losing team relegated to Division 3A
Division 3A
 The top two teams meet in Division 3A final, with the winning team promoted to Division 2B
Division 3B
 The top two teams meet in Division 3B final, but the winner is not promoted

Division 1A

Division 1 Format

The 12 teams in Division 1 are ranked into two groups of six teams named Division 1A and Division 1B. Each team play all the other teams in its group once. Two points are awarded for a win and one for a draw. The top four teams in 1A and 1B advance to the league quarter-finals with the top team in Division 1A playing the fourth team in Division 1B, the second team in Division 1A playing the third in Division 1B, etc.

Division 1A Table

Division 1A Rounds 1 to 5

Division 1A Round 1

Division 1A Round 2

Division 1A Round 3

Division 1A Round 4

Division 1A Round 5

Division 1B

Division 1B Table

Division 1B Rounds 1 to 5

Division 1B Round 1

Division 1B Round 2

Division 1B Round 3

Division 1B Round 4

Division 1B Round 5

Division 1 Knockout

Division 1 Quarter-Finals

On a pilot basis in 2017, the hurling quarter-finals will finish on the day the games are played avoiding the need for replays. If the score is level after the initial seventy minutes, still level after two ten minute periods of extra time played each way, and still level after a further two five minute periods of extra time, a free-taking competition will be held. Each team will nominate five players to take frees from their chosen position on the sixty five metre line. If the teams score an equal number of the five frees, the outcome of the match will be decided by sudden death frees using the same nominated players in the same order.

Division 1 Semi-Finals

On a pilot basis in 2017, the hurling semi-finals will finish on the day the games are played avoiding the need for replays. If the score is level after the initial seventy minutes, still level after two ten minute periods of extra time played each way, and still level after a further two five minute periods of extra time, a free-taking competition will be held. Each team will nominate five players to take frees from their chosen position on the sixty five metre line. If the teams score an equal number of the five frees, the outcome of the match will be decided by sudden death frees using the same nominated players in the same order.

Division 1 Final

Division 1A relegation play-off

Division 1B relegation play-off

Division 1 Scoring Statistics

Top scorer overall

Top scorers in a single game

Division 2A

Division 2A Table

Division 2A Rounds 1 to 5

Division 2A Round 1

Division 2A Round 2

Division 2A Round 3

Division 2A Round 4

Division 2A Round 5

Division 2A Final

Division 2A Scoring Statistics

Top scorer overall

Top scorers in a single game

Division 2B

Division 2B Table

Division 2B Rounds 1 to 5

Division 2B Round 1

Division 2B Round 2

Division 2B Round 3

Division 2B Round 4

Division 2B Round 5

Division 2B Final

Division 2B relegation play-off

Division 2B Scoring Statistics

Top scorer overall

Top scorers in a single game

Division 3A

Division 3A Table

Fingal withdrew from hurling competitions in 2017, thereby reducing Division 3A from five to four teams. There was no relegation from Division 3A and a double round of games in this division was played.

Division 3A Rounds 1 to 6

Division 3A Round 1

Division 3A Round 2

Division 3A Round 3

Division 3A Round 4

Division 3A Round 5

Division 3A Round 6

Division 3A Final

Division 3A Scoring Statistics

Top scorer overall

Top scorers in a single game

Division 3B

Division 3B Table

Division 3B Rounds 1 to 5

Division 3B Round 1

Division 3B Round 2

Division 3B Round 3

Division 3B Round 4

Division 3B Round 5

Division 3B Final

Division 3B Scoring Statistics

Top scorer overall

Top scorers in a single game

References

External links
Full Fixtures and Results

 
National Hurling League seasons